Mickey Spagnola, a former sportswriter for the now-defunct Dallas Times Herald, serves as the feature writer for DallasCowboys.com, tracking the daily activities of the Dallas Cowboys. Mickey writes articles and blogs for the site, but also hosts "Talkin' Cowboys", one of two daily radio shows broadcast exclusively on DallasCowboys.com. However, during the offseason, "Talkin' Cowboys" usually airs only once a week.

Spagnola used to make several daily appearances (one on each weekday show), known as "The Ranch Report", on Dallas radio station KTCK 1310 AM, "The Ticket".  This report provided listeners with general information on the Cowboys' daily activities.  He now reports news and provides insight on a similar show known as "The Valley Ranch Report" for Dallas radio station KRLD-FM 105.3 "The Fan".

Spagnola hails from Chicago, Illinois, and is a graduate of the University of Missouri.

References

External links
  Photo of Mickey Spagnola from Dallas Cowboys Weekly in 2005.

Living people
Year of birth missing (living people)
Writers from Chicago
University of Missouri alumni
Sportswriters from Illinois